Metronome All-Stars 1956 was the final album by the Metronome All-Stars, a loose amalgamation of musicians representing winners of Metronome magazine's annual poll. This 1956 release contains four tracks documenting the first collaboration between pianist/bandleader Count Basie and vocalist Ella Fitzgerald. 
The album was originally released on the Clef label in 1956.

Reception

AllMusic awarded the album 4 stars stating "This would be the final recording by The Metronome All-Stars (a series that started in the late '30s) and the music on this LP still sounds exciting and joyful".

Track listing
 "Billie's Bounce" (Charlie Parker) – 20:30	
 "April in Paris" (Vernon Duke, Yip Harburg) – 4:43	
 "Every Day I Have the Blues" (Peter Chatman, William York) – 5:11	
 "Party Blues" (Count Basie, Joe Williams, Ella Fitzgerald) – 3:59	
 "Basie's Back in Town" (Ernie Wilkins) – 3:16	
 "Lady Fair" (George Wallington) – 2:55
Recorded at Fine Sound in New York City on June 18 (tracks 1 & 6), June 25 (tracks 2–4) and June 27 (track 5), 1956

Personnel 
Ella Fitzgerald (tracks 2, 3 & 4), Joe Williams (tracks 3 & 4) – vocals
Count Basie (tracks 2–5), Billy Taylor (track 1), George Wallington (track 6) – piano
Wendell Culley (tracks 2, 3 & 5), Reunald Jones (tracks 2, 3 & 5), Thad Jones (tracks 1–5), Joe Newman (tracks 2–5) – trumpet
Eddie Bert (track 1), Henry Coker (tracks 2–5), Bill Hughes (tracks 2, 3 & 5), Benny Powell (tracks 2, 3 & 5) – trombone 
Marshall Royal – alto saxophone, clarinet (tracks 2, 3 & 5)
Tony Scott – clarinet (track 1)
Bill Graham (tracks 2, 3 & 5), Lee Konitz (track 1) – alto saxophone
Frank Wess – alto saxophone, tenor saxophone, flute (tracks 2–5)
Al Cohn (track 1), Frank Foster (tracks 2, 3 & 5), Zoot Sims (track 1) – tenor saxophone 
Serge Chaloff (track 1), Charlie Fowlkes (tracks 2, 3 & 5) – baritone saxophone 
Teddy Charles – vibraphone (track 1)
Tal Farlow (track 1), Freddie Green (tracks 2–5) – guitar
Eddie Jones (tracks 2–5), Charles Mingus (track 1) – bass
Art Blakey (track 1), Sonny Payne (tracks 2–5) – drums
Ralph Burns (tracks 2 & 3), Wild Bill Davis (track 2), Ernie Wilkins (track 5) – arranger

References 

1956 albums
Count Basie Orchestra albums
Ella Fitzgerald albums
Clef Records albums
Verve Records albums
Albums arranged by Ernie Wilkins
Albums arranged by Ralph Burns
Albums produced by Norman Granz